The Evans–Jensen classification is a system of categorizing intertrochanteric hip fractures based on the fracture pattern of the proximal femur.

Classification

See also
 Femoral fracture

References

Hip fracture classifications